Zapoteca sousae is a plant species native the Mexican States of Oaxaca and Colima. It tends to grow in undisturbed ravines in mountainous areas at elevations of approximately 1500 m (5000 feet).

Zapoteca sousae is a shrub or small tree up to 3 m tall. Leaves are up to 7 cm long including the rachis, bipinnately compound, with as many as 33 pairs of leaflets per pinna. Flower heads are borne in the axils of the leaves, the flowers greenish-white. Pods are dehiscent, up to 12 cm long when mature, containing dark brown, mottled seeds.

References

sousae
Flora of Oaxaca
Flora of Colima